Majiri is an administrative ward in the Manyoni District of the Singida Region of Tanzania. According to the 2002 census, the ward has a total population of 10,158.

References

Wards of Singida Region